South Salem is an unincorporated community in Wayne Township, Randolph County, in the U.S. state of Indiana.

History
South Salem was platted in 1849. An old variant name of the community was called Pollytown.

Geography

References

Unincorporated communities in Randolph County, Indiana
Unincorporated communities in Indiana